Rosa acicularis is a flowering plant in the Rosaceae family. It is commonly known as the prickly wild rose, prickly rose, bristly rose, wild rose or Arctic rose. It is a species of wild rose with a Holarctic distribution in northern regions of Asia, Europe, and North America.

Description
Rosa acicularis is a deciduous shrub growing 1–3 m tall. The leaves are pinnate, 7–14 cm long, with three to seven leaflets. The leaflets are ovate, with serrate (toothed) margins. The flowers are pink (rarely white), 3.5–5 cm diameter; the hips are red, pear-shaped to ovoid, 10–15 mm diameter. Its native habitats include thickets, stream banks, rocky bluffs, and wooded hillsides.

The ploidy of this rose species is variable. Botanical authorities have listed it as tetraploid and hexaploid in North America (subsp. sayi), and octoploid in Eurasia (subsp. acicularis), including China. On the northern Great Plains its populations are generally tetraploid. Hexaploid populations exist in the Yukon.

North America
This native rose species of the northern Great Plains is the provincial flower of Alberta. It is not as common in the Parkland region of the Canadian Prairie provinces as Rosa woodsii (Woods' rose), nor is it as common as Rosa woodsii in the boreal forest of northern North America.

Uses 
The hips, which stay on the plant through winter, are reported to be high in vitamins A and C. Native Americans made tea and salad from the leaves, and used the inner bark to smoke tobacco. Perfume has also been made from this plant.

See also

 List of Rosa species

References

acicularis
Flora of Europe
Flora of North America
Flora of temperate Asia
Holarctic flora
Plants used in Native American cuisine
Provincial symbols of Alberta